The 10th Pan American Games were held in Indianapolis, Indiana from August 7 to August 23, 1987.

Medals

Gold

 Men's 5000 metres - Arturo Barrios
 Men's 20 km road walk - Carlos Mercenario
 Men's 50 km road walk - Martín Bermudez
 Women's Marathon - María del Carmen Cárdenas
 Women's 10,000 metre track walk - María Colín

 Men's Individual Race (Road, 171 km) - Luis Rosendo Ramos

 Women's Double sculls - Martha García & Ana Gamble

 Men's 76 kg - Ernesto Rodríguez

Silver

 Men's team - Mexico
 Women's team - Mexico

 Men's 50 km road walk - Raúl González

 Men's 50 km Points Race (Track) - José Youshimatz

 Men's Light Middleweight (-78 kg) - Carlos Huttich

 Men's Single sculls - Joaquín Gómez
 Men's Lightweight coxless four - Mexico

 Men's 54 kg - Ricardo Jallath

 Men's Doubles - Mexico

Bronze

 Men's Javelin throw - Juan de la Garza

 Men's Team Time Trial (Road, 100 km) - Mexico

 Men's 3m Springboard - José Roche

 Individual dressage - Margarita Nava
 Team dressage - Mexico
 Individual jumping - Alberto Valdés
 Team jumping - Mexico

 Women's Team foil - Mexico

 Men's Pommel horse - Tony Piñeda
 Men's Vault - Alejandro Peniche

 Women's Single sculls - Martha García
 Women's Lightweight single sculls - Verónica Schreiber
 Women's Lightweight double sculls - Mexico

 Duet - Lourdes Candini & Susana Candini
 Team - Mexico

 Men's 58 kg - Federico Gómez

 Women's Doubles - Mexico

 Men's Freestyle (– 57 kg) - Jorge Olivera

Results by event

See also
Mexico at the 1990 Central American and Caribbean Games
Mexico at the 1988 Summer Olympics

References
 

Nations at the 1987 Pan American Games
P
1987